Neelam Gouhrani, known professionally as Nandini Rai, is an Indian actress and model who works in Telugu films. She is the winner of the Miss Andhra Pradesh title of 2010. After modelling, she went to pursue a career in acting.

Biography
Nandini hails from a Sindhi family. She completed her schooling from St. Albans High School, Hyderabad, graduating in 2005. She has completed her higher education in London. She has modeled for over 80 national and international brands. She holds an MBA Degree in finance from London. During her modelling stint, she has won several beauty contests, being named Miss Hyderabad 2008, Miss Andhra Pradesh 2010, Miss Pantaloons Fresh Face of AP 2009 and Miss Beautiful Eyes of AP 2010.

She has acted in the Hindi film Family Pack and the Telugu film Maaya. She has performed in another Telugu film Mosagallaku Mosagaadu. In 2012, she was seen in the Bollywood film Log In, too. She made her Malayalam film debut in A. Sajeed's Goodbye December. In the "musical love story", she portrays a young, naughty teacher. In 2014, she was signed for her first Kannada film Khushi Khushiyagi, in which she played a fashion designer. She has signed up her first Tamil film, a romantic thriller titled Grahanam. she has signed for a Telugu film Sudigaadu 2, in which she is playing a village belle. She was one of the contestants in reality show Bigg Boss 2, hosted by actor Nani.

Filmography

Films

Television

References

External links
 

Actresses in Telugu cinema
Actresses in Hindi cinema
Sindhi people
Actresses in Tamil cinema
Living people
Actresses in Malayalam cinema
Indian film actresses
21st-century Indian actresses
Actresses from Hyderabad, India
People from Secunderabad
Female models from Hyderabad, India
Bigg Boss (Telugu TV series) contestants
Actresses in Kannada cinema
Year of birth missing (living people)